Bolshebasayevo (Olo Basay) is a rural locality (a village) in Kuseyevsky Selsoviet, Baymaksky District, Bashkortostan, Russia. The population was 267 as of 2010. There are 2 streets.

Geography 
Bolshebasayevo is located 65 km north of Baymak (the district's administrative centre) by road. Isyanbetovo is the nearest rural locality.

References 

Rural localities in Baymaksky District